The Singapore Youth Flying Club (SYFC), headquartered at Seletar Airport, was established in December 1971 as the Junior Flying Club, by the Singapore Armed Forces (SAF). It aims to introduce and promote aviation to students, by providing aeromodelling courses for secondary school students and flight training courses for pre-tertiary students. The club's purpose is to provide flying experience to students, and boost recruiting for the Republic of Singapore Air Force (RSAF).

Fleet
The Junior Flying Club initially operated with a fleet of eight Cessna 172s and six AESL Airtourers, all of which were handed down from the RSAF. In 1989, the club acquired twelve Piper PA-28-161 Warrior IIs to replace the older Cessnas and Airtourers. Later, in November 2002, the club also purchased two PAC CT/4 Airtrainers. The fully aerobatic aircraft was meant to demonstrate to students the rigours of military flying.

In 2010, to replace the ageing Piper PA-28-161 Warrior IIs the SYFC purchased 13 Diamond DA40s, with first deliveries scheduled for late 2010. All 13 Diamond DA40s have since been delivered, while the older Piper Warriors and PAC Airtrainers have since been retired.

Current fleet

Former fleet

Notable alumni 

 Ng Chee Meng, Secretary-General of the National Trades Union Congress (NTUC), former Chief of Air Force and Chief of Defence Force
 MG Kelvin Khong, Chief of Air Force

References

Bibliography
 Cheong, Colin (2006), Flying Colours: Singapore Youth Flying Club, SNP International Publishing,

External links

 Singapore Youth Flying Club

Republic of Singapore Air Force
Aviation schools in Singapore
Youth organizations established in 1971
1971 establishments in Singapore